Paro FC is a Bhutanese professional football club based in Paro that competes in the Bhutan Premier League, the top level of Bhutanese football.

History 

Paro FC competed in the 2018 Bhutan National League after beating Paro United in the qualifying tournament, and finished the season as the runners-up behind Transport United. In 2019, Paro FC reached the semi-finals of the first-ever Samtse Championship. During the same season, Paro FC won its first national league title by winning the 2019 edition of the Bhutan Premier League.

Honours 
Bhutan Premier League
Winners (3): 2019, 2021, 2022
Runners-up (1): 2018
Jigme Dorji Wangchuk Memorial Gold Cup
Winners (1): 2019

Continental record 

All results (home and away) list Paro's goal tally first.

References

External links
Official website

Football clubs in Bhutan
Association football clubs established in 2018
2018 establishments in Bhutan